Money for Nothing is 1916 film directed by Maurice Elvey from a play by Arthur Eckersley. The cast features Guy Newall in the role of the Rev. Cuthbert Cheese, a curate on holiday whom gem thieves mistake for a detective.

References

External links

1916 films
1916 drama films
British drama films
British silent feature films
1910s English-language films
Films directed by Maurice Elvey
Films based on short fiction
British black-and-white films
1910s British films
Silent drama films